Obala is a town in Cameroon's Centre Province, ca 45 km north of Yaoundé, the capital of Cameroon.

Overview

The town is the seat of a Roman Catholic diocese and hosts a military academy. Tourists in Obala may visit the somewhat derelict Luna Park whose main attraction is a swimming pool. Not far from Obala are the Nachtigal Falls, actually a series of rapids in the Sanaga River. It has one fairly nice hotel and a large open-air market. The towns football club is called 'Tarzan'. The language spoken is Eton, a Beti language.

See also
Communes of Cameroon

Populated places in Centre Region (Cameroon)
Communes of Cameroon